Barbarians is a 1953 Soviet drama film directed by Leonid Lukov, Ilya Sudakov  and  Konstantin Zubov. It is based on Maxim Gorky's 1905 play of the same name.

Cast
 Yevdokiya Turchaninova as Bogayevskaya 
 Irina Likso as Lidiya  
 Vera Orlova 
 Evgeniy Velikhov  as Monakhov  
 Yelena Gogoleva as Monakhova  
 Nikolai Annenkov as Cherkun  
 Kseniya Tarasova
 Pavel Olenev  
 Konstantin Zubov as Tsiganov 
 Vladimir Golovin  as Arkhip Fomich Pritykin  
 Nikolai Shamin as Vasiliy Ivanovich Redozubov

References

Bibliography 
 Rollberg, Peter. Historical Dictionary of Russian and Soviet Cinema. Scarecrow Press, 2008.

External links 
 

1953 drama films
1953 films
Soviet drama films
1950s Russian-language films
Films based on works by Maxim Gorky
Films directed by Leonid Lukov
Gorky Film Studio films
Soviet black-and-white films
Soviet-era Ukrainian films